Apollon Kalamarias (Greek: Απόλλων Καλαμαριάς) is a Greek sport's club from Thessaloniki founded in 1926. The club is named after Apollo, the mythical Greek god and its colors are red and black.

History
When thousands of Pontic Greek refugees settled in and around Thessaloniki after the Greco-Turkish War and the subsequent population exchange, a group of them formed a musical club to continue their local traditions. The club's first emblem was the image of ancient Olympian god Apollo, Greek God of music and poetry.

Growing in popularity amongst the inhabitants of Kalamaria, the club soon expanded with a theatrical department, and later, a sports department. It was around this time the club colors were chosen - red, and black.

Departments 
Apollon Kalamarias F.C., football team playing at B Ethniki
Apollon Kalamarias V.C., volleyball team 
Apollon Kalamarias B.C., basketball team 
Apollon Kalamarias women's basketball, basketball women team

Titles 
Apollon Kalamarias F.C.
EPSM Championship
Winners (2): 1958, 1976
Second Division
Winners (3): 1972–73, 1982–83, 1991–92
Third Division
Winners (4): 1975-1976, 1979-1980, 2012–2013, 2016-2017

Apollon Kalamarias B.C.
Greek basketball women's Championship
Winner (2): 1974, 1992
Greek basketball women's cup
Winner (1): 1997

Apollon Kalamarias V.C.
Greek Volleyball League Cup
Runners-up (1): 2012

External links
Apollon Kalamarias Official site

 
Multi-sport clubs in Central Macedonia

de:Apollon Kalamarias
fr:Apollon Kalamarias
it:Apollon Kalamarias
nl:Apollon Kalamarias
pl:Apollon Kalamaria
pt:Apollon Kalamarias
ro:Apollon Kalamarias